Zhang Tixue (1915–1973) born Zhang Tizhao was a People's Republic of China politician. He was born in Xin County, Henan Province. He was Communist Party of China Committee Secretary and Governor of Hubei (1956).

1915 births
1973 deaths
People's Republic of China politicians from Henan
Chinese Communist Party politicians from Henan
Governors of Hubei
Political office-holders in Hubei